Shoeshine boy or shoe shine boy may refer to;

 Shoeshiner, someone who shines shoes
 "Shoeshine Boy", a 1975 song by singer Eddie Kendricks
 Shoeshine Boy (Underdog), a character from the animated series Underdog
 "Chattanoogie Shoe Shine Boy", a 1950 song by Red Foley
"Shoeshine Boy", a 1970 song by The Humblebums